Bushra Fuad Massouh is a Syrian politician and member of the Syrian Social Nationalist Party.

References

1958 births
Living people
Syrian Social Nationalist Party politicians